Muhammad Hamdan Zamzani (born 21 July 1997) is an Indonesian professional footballer who plays as a defender for Liga 1 club RANS Nusantara.

Early career
Zamzani started his career for joined PSS Sleman junior. He played for the PSS Sleman junior team at the U16, U19 to U21 levels. he also briefly played for Bali United U21 in 2016.

In 2014, he played a test match with his team against Indonesia U19 in the Nusantara Tour. His slick performance made the coach of the Indonesia U19 team at that time, Indra Sjafri, want to recruit him, to take part in training with the young Garuda squad.

Club career

PSS Sleman
in 2016, Zamzani joined PSS Sleman, he was promoted to the senior team, after previously he played for the junior team, almost 4 seasons, he only made 15 appearances during his debut in the team.

Loan to Sriwijaya
On 2 April 2019, Sriwijaya announced that Zamzani had joined the Liga 2 club on loan from PSS Sleman for the 2019 season. During his loan spell, Zamzani wore the number 24 jersey. Zamzani was obtained by the Laskar Wong Kito, with a loan option until March 31, 2020.

Loan to Muba Babel United
On 21 August 2019, Zamzani joined  Muba Babel United on loan for the 2019 season. Zamzani made his league goal against Sriwijaya on 17 October. he scored in the 44th minute.

Persiraja Banda Aceh
On 9 June 2021, Zamzani signed a one-year contract with Persiraja Banda Aceh on a free transfer. He made his professional debut for the club, in a 2–1 loss against Bhayangkara on 29 August 2021.

RANS Cilegon
He was signed for RANS Cilegon to play in the second round of Liga 2 in the 2021 season. Zamzani made his league debut on 15 December 2021 in a match against Persis Solo at the Pakansari Stadium, Cibinong.

Honours

PSS Sleman
 Liga 2: 2018
RANS Cilegon
 Liga 2 runner-up: 2021

References

External links
 

1997 births
Living people
Indonesian footballers
Liga 1 (Indonesia) players
Liga 2 (Indonesia) players
PSS Sleman players
Sriwijaya F.C. players
Muba Babel United F.C. players
Persiraja Banda Aceh players
RANS Nusantara F.C. players
Association football defenders
People from Sleman Regency
Sportspeople from Special Region of Yogyakarta